The Moreland Street Historic District is a historic district roughly bounded by Kearsarge, Blue Hill Avenues, and Warren, Waverly, and Winthrop Streets in the Roxbury neighborhood of Boston, Massachusetts.  It encompasses  of predominantly residential urban streetscape, which was developed between about 1840 and 1920.  Housing types represent a cross-section of architectural styles from the period, including Second Empire, Italianate, and Queen Anne style.  It is a fairly well-preserved grouping in an area where many sections have been negatively affected by urban blight and redevelopment.  One notable house is at 130 Warren Street: it is the only house in the district built out of Roxbury puddingstone. That building is currently under study as a pending landmark for the Boston Landmarks Commission.

The district was listed on the National Register of Historic Places in 1984.

See also
National Register of Historic Places listings in southern Boston, Massachusetts

References

Historic districts in Suffolk County, Massachusetts
Streetcar suburbs
Roxbury, Boston
National Register of Historic Places in Boston
Historic districts on the National Register of Historic Places in Massachusetts